Rolston is a surname. Notable people with the surname include: 

Brian Rolston (born 1973), hockey player
Ed Rolston (born 1990), Hong Kong rugby player
Emma Rolston (born 1996), New Zealand association football player
Holmes Rolston III (born 1932), American philosopher
Ken Rolston, American computer, board and role-playing game designer
Mark Rolston (born 1956), American actor
Matthew Rolston, American photographer
Peter Rolston (1937–2006), Canadian minister and political figure
Ron Rolston (born 1966), American ice hockey coach
Shauna Rolston (born 1967), Canadian cellist
Steve Rolston (born 1978), Canadian comic book artist
Tilly Rolston (1887–1953), Canadian politician
Tom Rolston (1932–2010), Canadian violinist and conductor